We Mean Business is the seventh studio album released by rap duo, EPMD. It was released on December 9, 2008 through EP Records, making it the group's first album since 1999's Out of Business.

Track listing

Charts

References

External links

2008 albums
EPMD albums
Albums produced by Erick Sermon
Albums produced by 9th Wonder
Albums produced by DJ Honda
Albums produced by Ty Fyffe